This page lists all described species of the spider family Orsolobidae accepted by the World Spider Catalog :

A

Afrilobus

Afrilobus Griswold & Platnick, 1987
 A. australis Griswold & Platnick, 1987 — South Africa
 A. capensis Griswold & Platnick, 1987 (type) — South Africa
 A. jocquei Griswold & Platnick, 1987 — Malawi

Anopsolobus

Anopsolobus Forster & Platnick, 1985
 A. subterraneus Forster & Platnick, 1985 (type) — New Zealand

Ascuta

Ascuta Forster, 1956
 A. australis Forster, 1956 — New Zealand
 A. cantuaria Forster & Platnick, 1985 — New Zealand
 A. inopinata Forster, 1956 — New Zealand
 A. insula Forster & Platnick, 1985 — New Zealand
 A. leith Forster & Platnick, 1985 — New Zealand
 A. media Forster, 1956 (type) — New Zealand
 A. monowai Forster & Platnick, 1985 — New Zealand
 A. montana Forster & Platnick, 1985 — New Zealand
 A. musca Forster & Platnick, 1985 — New Zealand
 A. ornata Forster, 1956 — New Zealand
 A. parornata Forster & Platnick, 1985 — New Zealand
 A. taupo Forster & Platnick, 1985 — New Zealand
 A. tongariro Forster & Platnick, 1985 — New Zealand
 A. univa Forster & Platnick, 1985 — New Zealand

Australobus

Australobus Forster & Platnick, 1985
 A. torbay Forster & Platnick, 1985 (type) — Australia (Western Australia)

Azanialobus

Azanialobus Griswold & Platnick, 1987
 A. lawrencei Griswold & Platnick, 1987 (type) — South Africa

B

Basibulbus

Basibulbus Ott, Platnick, Berniker & Bonaldo, 2013
 B. concepcion Ott, Platnick, Berniker & Bonaldo, 2013 — Chile
 B. granizo Ott, Platnick, Berniker & Bonaldo, 2013 — Chile
 B. malleco Ott, Platnick, Berniker & Bonaldo, 2013 (type) — Chile

Bealeyia

Bealeyia Forster & Platnick, 1985
 B. unicolor Forster & Platnick, 1985 (type) — New Zealand

C

Calculus

Calculus Purcell, 1910
 C. bicolor Purcell, 1910 (type) — South Africa

Chileolobus

Chileolobus Forster & Platnick, 1985
 C. eden Forster & Platnick, 1985 (type) — Chile

Cornifalx

Cornifalx Hickman, 1979
 C. insignis Hickman, 1979 (type) — Australia (Tasmania)

D

Dugdalea

Dugdalea Forster & Platnick, 1985
 D. oculata Forster & Platnick, 1985 (type) — New Zealand

Duripelta

Duripelta Forster, 1956
 D. alta Forster & Platnick, 1985 — New Zealand
 D. australis Forster, 1956 — New Zealand
 D. borealis Forster, 1956 (type) — New Zealand
 D. egmont Forster & Platnick, 1985 — New Zealand
 D. hunua Forster & Platnick, 1985 — New Zealand
 D. koomaa Forster & Platnick, 1985 — New Zealand
 D. mawhero Forster & Platnick, 1985 — New Zealand
 D. minuta Forster, 1956 — New Zealand
 D. monowai Forster & Platnick, 1985 — New Zealand
 D. otara Forster & Platnick, 1985 — New Zealand
 D. pallida (Forster, 1956) — New Zealand
 D. paringa Forster & Platnick, 1985 — New Zealand
 D. peha Forster & Platnick, 1985 — New Zealand
 D. scuta Forster & Platnick, 1985 — New Zealand
 D. totara Forster & Platnick, 1985 — New Zealand
 D. townsendi Forster & Platnick, 1985 — New Zealand
 D. watti Forster & Platnick, 1985 — New Zealand

F

Falklandia

Falklandia Forster & Platnick, 1985
 F. rumbolli (Schiapelli & Gerschman, 1974) (type) — Falkland Is.

H

Hickmanolobus

Hickmanolobus Forster & Platnick, 1985
 H. ibisca Baehr & Smith, 2008 — Australia (Queensland, New South Wales)
 H. jojo Baehr & Smith, 2008 — Australia (New South Wales)
 H. linnaei Baehr & Smith, 2008 — Australia (New South Wales)
 H. mollipes (Hickman, 1932) (type) — Australia (Tasmania)
 H. nimorakiotakisi Baehr, Raven & Hebron, 2011 — Australia (Queensland)

L

Losdolobus

Losdolobus Platnick & Brescovit, 1994
 L. nelsoni Pompozzi, 2015 — Uruguay, Argentina
 L. opytapora Brescovit, Bertoncello & Ott, 2004 — Brazil
 L. parana Platnick & Brescovit, 1994 (type) — Brazil, Argentina
 L. xaruanus Lise & Almeida, 2006 — Brazil
 L. ybypora Brescovit, Ott & Lise, 2004 — Brazil

M

Mallecolobus

Mallecolobus Forster & Platnick, 1985
 M. malacus Forster & Platnick, 1985 (type) — Chile
 M. maullin Forster & Platnick, 1985 — Chile
 M. pedrus Forster & Platnick, 1985 — Chile
 M. sanus Forster & Platnick, 1985 — Chile

Maoriata

Maoriata Forster & Platnick, 1985
 M. magna (Forster, 1956) (type) — New Zealand
 M. montana Forster & Platnick, 1985 — New Zealand
 M. vulgaris Forster & Platnick, 1985 — New Zealand

O

Orongia

Orongia Forster & Platnick, 1985
 O. medialis Forster & Platnick, 1985 (type) — New Zealand
 O. motueka Forster & Platnick, 1985 — New Zealand
 O. whangamoa Forster & Platnick, 1985 — New Zealand

Orsolobus

Orsolobus Simon, 1893
 O. chelifer Tullgren, 1902 — Chile
 O. chilensis Forster & Platnick, 1985 — Chile
 O. mapocho Forster & Platnick, 1985 — Chile
 O. montt Forster & Platnick, 1985 — Chile
 O. plenus Forster & Platnick, 1985 — Chile
 O. pucara Forster & Platnick, 1985 — Chile, Argentina
 O. pucatrihue Forster & Platnick, 1985 — Chile
 O. schlingeri Forster & Platnick, 1985 — Chile
 O. singularis (Nicolet, 1849) (type) — Chile

Osornolobus

Osornolobus Forster & Platnick, 1985
 O. anticura Forster & Platnick, 1985 — Chile
 O. antillanca Forster & Platnick, 1985 — Chile
 O. canan Forster & Platnick, 1985 (type) — Chile
 O. cautin Forster & Platnick, 1985 — Chile
 O. cekalovici Forster & Platnick, 1985 — Chile
 O. chaiten Forster & Platnick, 1985 — Chile
 O. chapo Forster & Platnick, 1985 — Chile
 O. chiloe Forster & Platnick, 1985 — Chile
 O. concepcion Forster & Platnick, 1985 — Chile
 O. correntoso Forster & Platnick, 1985 — Chile
 O. magallanes Forster & Platnick, 1985 — Chile
 O. malalcahuello Forster & Platnick, 1985 — Chile
 O. nahuelbuta Forster & Platnick, 1985 — Chile
 O. newtoni Forster & Platnick, 1985 — Chile
 O. penai Forster & Platnick, 1985 — Chile
 O. thayerae Forster & Platnick, 1985 — Chile
 O. trancas Forster & Platnick, 1985 — Chile

P

Paralobus

Paralobus Forster & Platnick, 1985
 P. salmoni (Forster, 1956) (type) — New Zealand

Pounamuella

Pounamuella Forster & Platnick, 1985
 P. australis (Forster, 1964) — New Zealand (Auckland Is.)
 P. complexa (Forster, 1956) — New Zealand
 P. hauroko Forster & Platnick, 1985 — New Zealand
 P. hollowayae (Forster, 1956) — New Zealand
 P. insula Forster & Platnick, 1985 — New Zealand
 P. kuscheli Forster & Platnick, 1985 — New Zealand
 P. ramsayi (Forster, 1956) — New Zealand
 P. vulgaris (Forster, 1956) (type) — New Zealand

S

Subantarctia

Subantarctia Forster, 1955
 S. centralis Forster & Platnick, 1985 — New Zealand
 S. dugdalei Forster, 1956 — New Zealand
 S. fiordensis Forster, 1956 — New Zealand
 S. florae Forster, 1956 — New Zealand
 S. muka Forster & Platnick, 1985 — New Zealand
 S. penara Forster & Platnick, 1985 — New Zealand
 S. stewartensis Forster, 1956 — New Zealand
 S. trina Forster & Platnick, 1985 — New Zealand
 S. turbotti Forster, 1955 (type) — New Zealand (Auckland Is.)

T

Tangata

Tangata Forster & Platnick, 1985
 T. alpina (Forster, 1956) — New Zealand
 T. furcata Forster & Platnick, 1985 — New Zealand
 T. horningi Forster & Platnick, 1985 — New Zealand
 T. kohuka Forster & Platnick, 1985 — New Zealand
 T. murihiku Forster & Platnick, 1985 — New Zealand
 T. nigra Forster & Platnick, 1985 (type) — New Zealand
 T. orepukiensis (Forster, 1956) — New Zealand
 T. otago Forster & Platnick, 1985 — New Zealand
 T. parafurcata Forster & Platnick, 1985 — New Zealand
 T. plena (Forster, 1956) — New Zealand
 T. pouaka Forster & Platnick, 1985 — New Zealand
 T. rakiura (Forster, 1956) — New Zealand
 T. stewartensis (Forster, 1956) — New Zealand
 T. sylvester Forster & Platnick, 1985 — New Zealand
 T. tautuku Forster & Platnick, 1985 — New Zealand
 T. townsendi Forster & Platnick, 1985 — New Zealand
 T. waipoua Forster & Platnick, 1985 — New Zealand

Tasmanoonops

Tasmanoonops Hickman, 1930
 T. alipes Hickman, 1930 (type) — Australia (Tasmania)
 T. australis Forster & Platnick, 1985 — Australia (Western Australia)
 T. buang Forster & Platnick, 1985 — Australia (Victoria)
 T. buffalo Forster & Platnick, 1985 — Australia (Victoria)
 T. complexus Forster & Platnick, 1985 — Australia (Queensland)
 T. daviesae Forster & Platnick, 1985 — Australia (Queensland)
 T. dorrigo Forster & Platnick, 1985 — Australia (New South Wales)
 T. drimus Forster & Platnick, 1985 — Australia (Victoria)
 T. elongatus Forster & Platnick, 1985 — Australia (New South Wales)
 T. fulvus Hickman, 1979 — Australia (Tasmania)
 T. grayi Forster & Platnick, 1985 — Australia (New South Wales)
 T. hickmani Forster & Platnick, 1985 — Australia (Queensland)
 T. hunti Forster & Platnick, 1985 — Australia (New South Wales)
 T. inornatus Hickman, 1979 — Australia (Tasmania)
 T. insulanus Forster & Platnick, 1985 — Australia (Tasmania)
 T. magnus Hickman, 1979 — Australia (Tasmania)
 T. mainae Forster & Platnick, 1985 — Australia (Western Australia)
 T. minutus Forster & Platnick, 1985 — Australia (Victoria)
 T. mysticus Forster & Platnick, 1985 — Australia (New South Wales)
 T. oranus Forster & Platnick, 1985 — Australia (Victoria)
 T. otimus Forster & Platnick, 1985 — Australia (New South Wales)
 T. pallidus Forster & Platnick, 1985 — Australia (New South Wales)
 T. parinus Forster & Platnick, 1985 — Australia (New South Wales)
 T. parvus Forster & Platnick, 1985 — Australia (Queensland)
 T. pinus Forster & Platnick, 1985 — Australia (New South Wales)
 T. ripus Forster & Platnick, 1985 — Australia (New South Wales)
 T. rogerkitchingi Baehr, Raven & Hebron, 2011 — Australia (Queensland)
 T. septentrionalis Forster & Platnick, 1985 — Australia (Queensland)
 T. trispinus Forster & Platnick, 1985 — Australia (Tasmania)
 T. unicus Forster & Platnick, 1985 — Australia (Queensland)

Tautukua

Tautukua Forster & Platnick, 1985
 T. isolata Forster & Platnick, 1985 (type) — New Zealand

Turretia

Turretia Forster & Platnick, 1985
 T. dugdalei Forster & Platnick, 1985 (type) — New Zealand

W

Waiporia

Waiporia Forster & Platnick, 1985
 W. algida (Forster, 1956) — New Zealand
 W. chathamensis Forster & Platnick, 1985 — New Zealand (Chatham Is.)
 W. egmont Forster & Platnick, 1985 — New Zealand
 W. extensa (Forster, 1956) — New Zealand
 W. hawea Forster & Platnick, 1985 — New Zealand
 W. hornabrooki (Forster, 1956) — New Zealand
 W. mensa (Forster, 1956) — New Zealand
 W. modica (Forster, 1956) — New Zealand
 W. owaka Forster & Platnick, 1985 — New Zealand
 W. ruahine Forster & Platnick, 1985 — New Zealand
 W. tuata Forster & Platnick, 1985 — New Zealand
 W. wiltoni Forster & Platnick, 1985 (type) — New Zealand

Waipoua

Waipoua Forster & Platnick, 1985
 W. gressitti (Forster, 1964) — New Zealand (Campbell Is.)
 W. hila Forster & Platnick, 1985 — New Zealand
 W. insula Forster & Platnick, 1985 — New Zealand
 W. montana Forster & Platnick, 1985 — New Zealand
 W. otiana Forster & Platnick, 1985 — New Zealand
 W. ponanga Forster & Platnick, 1985 — New Zealand
 W. toronui Forster & Platnick, 1985 (type) — New Zealand
 W. totara (Forster, 1956) — New Zealand

Wiltonia

Wiltonia Forster & Platnick, 1985
 W. elongata Forster & Platnick, 1985 — New Zealand
 W. eylesi Forster & Platnick, 1985 — New Zealand
 W. fiordensis Forster & Platnick, 1985 — New Zealand
 W. graminicola Forster & Platnick, 1985 (type) — New Zealand
 W. lima Forster & Platnick, 1985 — New Zealand
 W. nelsonensis Forster & Platnick, 1985 — New Zealand
 W. pecki Forster & Platnick, 1985 — New Zealand
 W. porina Forster & Platnick, 1985 — New Zealand
 W. rotoiti Forster & Platnick, 1985 — New Zealand

References

Orsolobidae